James Elward (Chicago, November 22, 1928 – August 30, 1996) was an American author, actor, screenwriter, and playwright.

Personal life and education
He was born in Chicago, Illinois to Daisyann Lenert Elward and Joseph Francis Elward. He was the brother to Paul Elward. A native of Chicago, he received a bachelor's degree in 1950 from The Catholic University of America in Washington.

James Elward resided in New York City. He was most noted for writing soap operas in the 1960s and 1970s such as The Secret Storm, The Guiding Light, and Dr. Kildare. He also wrote and produced a soap opera called The Young Marrieds.

Additionally, he wrote several plays for theaters in New York and London. He was active in summer stock with the Barnstormers in Tamworth, New Hampshire.

He published three novels for Doubleday under the name of "Rebecca James": Storm's End (1974), The House Is Dark (1976), and Tomorrow Is Mine (1979). He also published under his own name, including Ask For Nothing More (1984), Monday's Child Is Dead (1995), and Public Smiles, Private Tears (1982) with Helen Van Slyke, a New York Times bestseller.

In 1991 he helped to organize Mystery Stage, Inc. a group that worked to foster stage performances in the mystery genre in New York City. He died in 1996.

Novels
 Public Smiles, Private Tears - with Helen Van Slyke
 Monday's Child Is Dead
 Ask for Nothing More
 As Rebecca James:
 Storm's End
 The House Is Dark
 Tomorrow Is Mine

The New York Times Book Section covered his death in New York City:
The book Public Smiles, Private Tears was about a woman's rise in the world of retail fashion. One reviewer wrote, "James Elward has done his assigned (and subservient) job commendably -- perhaps even with a bit more style and vitality than the author who was dying as she wrote." The novel was on the New York Times hard-cover fiction best-seller list for 14 weeks in 1982, rising to seventh place. In 1983 its paperback edition reached fifth place on the Times best-seller list of mass-market paperback books.

Elward's most critically acclaimed play, Best of Friends, was first produced in London in 1970.

Elward performed for 40 years at the Barnstormers Theatre in Tamworth, New Hampshire. Photos of his work can be viewed here.

Other plays include:
 Mary Agnes Is Thirty Five
 Passport
 The River

Before he was an author and playwright, Elward was a screenwriter; notably for The Young Marrieds and Strange Paradise.

References

External links
 
 Family Web site
 Archives of James Elward's work at University of Wyoming. American Heritage Center.

American male screenwriters
American soap opera writers
Writers from Chicago
Screenwriters from New York (state)
Writers from New York City
Male actors from Chicago
1928 births
1996 deaths
20th-century American male actors
20th-century American dramatists and playwrights
American male television writers
American male dramatists and playwrights
Screenwriters from Illinois
20th-century American male writers
20th-century American screenwriters